The Hong Kong women's sevens rugby union team represents Hong Kong at an international level and plays at the Hong Kong Women's Sevens and other international sevens tournaments. They competed at the 2020 Women's Rugby Sevens Final Olympic Qualification Tournament in Monaco. They were beaten by France in the finals 51 - 0 and missed out on qualifying for Tokyo 2020.

Current squad
Agnes Chan
Christy Cheng
Ka Yan Chong
Jessica Ho
Melody Li
Ka Man Nam
Natasha Olson-Thorne
Aggie Poon
Sum Sham
Colleen Tjosvold
Maggie Au Yeng
Stephanie Chan
Charmaine Da Costa
Agnes Tse
Jessica Eden
Sarah Lucas

Tournament History

Asian Games

Achievements
 Darwin Sevens Tournament: 1st Place
 Hong Kong 7s 2014: 9th Place
 Women’s World Series Qualifier 2014: 9th Place
 Asian Sevens Series Hong Kong 2014: 2nd Place
 Asian Sevens Series Beijing 2014: 3rd Place
 Asian Sevens Series 2014 Overall Placing: 3rd Place
 Margaret River 7s Tournament 2015: 1st Place
 Borneo Sevens 2015: 4th Place
 Hong Kong 7s 2015: 4th Place
 World Series Qualifier Dublin 2015: 6th Place
 Asian Sevens Series Qingdao 2015: 1st Place

References

Asian national women's rugby union teams
Rugby union in Hong Kong
Hong Kong national rugby union team
Women's national rugby sevens teams